South Worcester Historic District is a national historic district located at South Worcester in Otsego County, New York.  It encompasses 41 contributing buildings and three contributing sites in this rural hamlet. It is composed primarily of 19th and early 20th century frame residences and outbuildings representing typical vernacular interpretations of popular national styles for the period from about 1810 to 1942.

It was listed on the National Register of Historic Places in 1992.

Gallery

References

Historic districts on the National Register of Historic Places in New York (state)
Houses on the National Register of Historic Places in New York (state)
Federal architecture in New York (state)
Italianate architecture in New York (state)
Historic districts in Otsego County, New York
National Register of Historic Places in Otsego County, New York